Luciocephalus pulcher, the pikehead, giant pikehead or crocodile pikehead, is a species of gourami native to the Malaya Peninsula, Sumatra, and Borneo. It is a yellowish-brown fish with dark brown longitudinal bands and stripes, and can reach a length of  SL.  

It can also be found in the aquarium trade, where it is notoriously difficult to keep; they require extremely soft, acidic water and seldom eat dead foods.

Habitat 
It can be found in a variety of habitats like flooded forests, streams, and peat swamps, especially in areas with plentiful vegetation.

Behavior 
Compared to most gouramies, it is a highly specialized ambush predator that spends most of its time lying motionless near plants or other cover for potential prey to approach; when it does attack a potential meal (usually a smaller fish), it is able to extend its jaw to about one-third of its body length, allowing it to successfully prey upon fishes almost half of its own length. 

Like several closely related genera (such as Sphaerichthys), it is a mouthbrooder (in this case a paternal mouthbrooder).

References

pulcher
Fish of Southeast Asia
Fish described in 1830
Taxa named by John Edward Gray